Love in a Wood; Or, St James's Park is a 1671 comedy play by the English writer William Wycherley. His debut play, it was first staged at the Theatre Royal, Drury Lane by the King's Company.

The original cast included Charles Hart as Ranger, Richard Bell as Vincent, Edward Kynaston as Valentine, John Lacy as Alderman Gripe, William Wintershall as Sir Simon Addleplot, Michael Mohun as Dapperwit, Elizabeth Boutell as Christina, Elizabeth Cox as Lydia, Mary Knep as  Lady Flippant, Katherine Corey as  Mrs Joyner and Elizabeth James as Isabel. The published version of the following year was dedicated to the Duchess of Cleveland, mistress of Charles II.

References

Bibliography
 Van Lennep, W. The London Stage, 1660-1800: Volume One, 1660-1700. Southern Illinois University Press, 1960.

1671 plays
West End plays
Plays by William Wycherley
Restoration comedy
Plays set in London